Minneapolis City Center (also known simply as City Center) is a mixed-use shopping mall on Nicollet Mall in Minneapolis, Minnesota. It opened in 1983 and occupies the bottom three floors of the 33 South Sixth office building. Designed by Skidmore, Owings & Merrill, Minneapolis City Center contains  of leasable retail space. The mall was built around the pre-existing Forum Cafeteria restaurant. The building is adjacent to the Marriott Hotel City Center and connected to the Gaviidae Common shopping mall.

Until January 2023, Minneapolis City Center was anchored by Marshalls. Currently all anchor spaces sit vacant. Former major tenants at the mall included Carson Pirie Scott, Donaldson's, Montgomery Ward, Office Depot, Saks Off Fifth Avenue, and Sports Authority. Through the Minneapolis Skyway System, the mall connects to six other surrounding buildings. The center has also undergone several major renovations, including one in 2005 and an ongoing one that began in 2019.

History 
Minneapolis City Center first opened in 1983 between the 6th and 7th Street blocks along Minneapolis' Nicollet Mall. It was designed by the architectural firm Skidmore, Owings & Merrill, occupying the first three floors of the 33 South Sixth skyscraper. Ground was broken for the project in December 1979, headed by Minneapolis City Council president Lou DeMars. Construction of the mall was estimated to cost US$37 million (US$130 million in 2019), with assistance from a citywide tax increment initiative. Canada-based Oxford Properties agreed to develop Minneapolis City Center after much discussion: "Oxford pitched the project to the [Minneapolis] council by promising to reimburse the city for the full cost of acquiring the downtown block [...] First, though, the city would have to acquire the site using its powers of condemnation, bulldoze the existing building, and prepare the site for construction." The mall was originally anchored by a flagship Donaldson's department store, which opened ahead of the rest of the project in August 1982. The anchor later transitioned into a Carson Pirie Scott location after the retailer purchased Donaldson's in 1986.

In 1993, Montgomery Ward took over some of the space previously occupied by Carson Pirie Scott. Unused parts of the anchor tenant were transformed into leasable space for Marshalls and smaller retailers such as Limited Express and Musicland. Montgomery Ward later closed its Minneapolis location in October 1997 and was partially replaced with an Office Depot location in 1999. During 2005, the shopping center underwent a US$15 million renovation. San Francisco-based Shorenstein Properties purchased Minneapolis City Center in 2012.

In January 2015, Saks Fifth Avenue announced plans to open a clearance store at the Minneapolis City Center, relocating from their former  location at the neighboring Gaviidae Common. The new location opened on April 21, 2016, in the two-story,  space formerly occupied by Office Depot, which closed in 2014. On October 9, 2015, Sports Authority opened a  anchor store on the southern corner. Less than a year later, the location closed along with 140 other locations nationwide. During Super Bowl LII, which took place in Minneapolis, the empty space last tenanted by Sports Authority was used as temporary office space for National Football League employees and volunteers. Other tenants leasing space at Minneapolis City Center throughout the decade include Allen Edmonds, Brooks Brothers, Fogo de Chão, and GNC. Cardigan Donuts also opened their flagship location at City Center in 2017. Local upscale retailer Len Druskin once occupied several spaces within the shopping center but shuttered all locations in 2017, following a buyout from Lebanese-American businessman Marcus Lemonis.

On July 15, 2018, a customer inside of the basement Marshalls store deliberately set a clothing rack on fire, causing US$500,000 worth of damage to merchandise. A month later, the suspect was arrested and charged with two counts of arson, backed by surveillance camera footage which captured the incident. In October of the same year, a restaurant named Fhima's launched in a space previously vacant but once occupied by a cafeteria-style eatery. In March 2021, the Target Corporation, a major tenant of 33 South Sixth and an occupant of Minneapolis City Center, announced it would prematurely end its lease.

Design and location 

Minneapolis City Center features elements of modern and brutalist architecture. According to MinnPosts Nick Magrino, the center's brutalist exterior appearance is similar to that of the nearby Riverside Plaza apartment complex. It was designed as part of an initiative by Minneapolis to increase the amount of retail located within the downtown neighborhood. Minneapolis City Center incorporated an already existing onsite restaurant, named the Forum Cafeteria, into its design during construction. The appearance of the center, however, was criticized by some Minneapolis residents for being "bland" and boring. Beneath the shopping mall is a seven-story parking garage with 687 spaces for employees of the building and 33 South Sixth.

Minneapolis City Center also serves as a major hub for the Minneapolis Skyway System, serving as a connecting point for six skyways. The mall connects to 50 South Sixth, 700 Nicollet, Gaviidae Common, Mayo Clinic Square, the Plymouth Building, and Radisson Blu Minneapolis Downtown. Adjacent to the building is the Marriott Hotel City Center, the tallest hotel in Minneapolis, which was also designed by Skidmore, Owings & Merrill and completed in 1983.

Future construction 
In June 2018, an unidentified foreign buyer purchased Minneapolis City Center and the adjoining 33 South Sixth building for US$320 million, establishing a record-breaking sale for office-designated buildings in Minnesota. Minneapolis-based Ryan Companies serves as the new manager of the retail complex according to city documents. Upon the news, Ryan Companies announced plans to renovate the center in order to create better access to Nicollet Mall. On August 1, 2019, the US$3 million renovation began on the mall's eastern facade, beginning with the removal process of precast concrete panels. One of the new corner entrances to the building, reopened in September 2020, amidst the COVID-19 pandemic. The US$3 million entrance was described as "definitely an upgrade" to City Center by Star Tribunes Neal St. Anthony.

References

External links 
 Official website

1983 establishments in Minnesota
Buildings and structures in Minneapolis
Shopping malls established in 1983
Shopping malls in Hennepin County, Minnesota
Shopping malls in Minnesota
Skidmore, Owings & Merrill buildings
Tourist attractions in Minneapolis